Religio Medici (The Religion of a Doctor) by Sir Thomas Browne is a spiritual testament and early psychological self-portrait. Published in 1643 after an unauthorized version was distributed the previous year, it became a European best-seller which brought its author fame at home and abroad.

Themes

Religion 

Structured upon the Christian virtues of Faith and Hope (part 1) and Charity (part 2), Browne expresses his beliefs in the doctrine of sola fide, the existence of hell, the Last Judgment, the resurrection and other tenets of Christianity.

Science and religion 
Throughout Religio Medici Browne uses scientific imagery to illustrate religious truths as part of his discussion on the relationship of science to religion.

Reception and influence
A rare surviving contemporary review by Guy Patin, a distinguished member of the Parisian medical faculty, indicates the considerable impact Religio Medici had upon the intelligentsia abroad: 

Throughout the seventeenth century Religio Medici spawned numerous imitative titles, including John Dryden's great poem, Religio Laici, but none matched the frank, intimate tone of the original in which Browne shares his thoughts, as well as the idiosyncrasies of his personality with his reader.

Samuel Pepys in his diaries complained that the Religio was cried up to the whole world for its wit and learning.

A translation into German of the Religio was made in 1746 and an early admirer of Browne's spiritual testament was Goethe's one-time associate Lavater.

In the early nineteenth century Religio Medici was "re-discovered" by the English Romantics. Charles Lamb introduced it to Samuel Taylor Coleridge, who after reading it, exclaimed,-

O to write a character of this man!

Thomas de Quincey in his Confessions of an English Opium-Eater also praised it, stating: 

The book strongly influenced the prominent physician William Osler in his early years. Osler, who is considered the "father of modern medicine", is said to have learned it by heart.

In Virginia Woolf's opinion Religio Medici paved the way for all future confessionals, private memoirs and personal writings.

In the twentieth century, the Swiss psychologist Carl Jung used the term Religio Medici several times in his writings.

Literary allusions 

Dorothy L. Sayers in her novel Gaudy Night has Harriet Vane discover that Peter Wimsey is reading Religio Medici.  It helps her better understand his character and motivations.

Patricia Highsmith’s novel Strangers on a Train references a morocco-bound copy of the work, and Guy reflects on his favorite passages.

In Excellent Women by Barbara Pym, the sad, spinsterish church-lady, Mildred Lathbury has a copy on her bedside table.

References

External links
Text of Religio Medici (1643 edition, 1645 edition)
A Religio Medici bibliography (1905)
 

1643 books
Philosophy books
British non-fiction literature
Works by Thomas Browne
Books about Christianity